Kenneth Forrest Duncan (March 7, 1881 – February 4, 1952) was a public servant, farmer, financial agent and political figure in British Columbia. He represented Cowichan in the Legislative Assembly of British Columbia from 1919 to 1924 as an Independent member.

He was born in Duncan, British Columbia, which was named after his father, William Chalmers Duncan. Duncan was employed with the civil service in Ottawa from 1901 to 1903 and then farmed in Duncan from 1903 until 1907 when he established his own business. He served as mayor of Duncan in 1907. In 1912, he married Agnes Patterson. Duncan was defeated by William Henry Hayward when he ran for a seat in the assembly in 1916 and then was elected in a 1919 by-election held after Hayward assumed official military duties in Ottawa. He was re elected in 1920 and then defeated when he ran for reelection in the new riding of Cowichan-Newcastle in 1924. He died in Duncan at the age of 70.

References 

1881 births
1952 deaths
Independent MLAs in British Columbia
Mayors of places in British Columbia
People from Duncan, British Columbia